Panic! at the Disco is an American rock band that originated in Las Vegas, Nevada. Their 2005 debut album, A Fever You Can't Sweat Out, reached number 13 on the US Billboard 200, and has sold more than 2.2 million copies since its September 2005 release, spearheaded by the quintuple platinum top-10 hit single, "I Write Sins Not Tragedies". The band's second album, Pretty. Odd., was released on March 21, 2008, entering the US chart at, and peaking at, number 2. Their third effort, Vices & Virtues, was released on March 18, 2011, and peaked at number 7 in the US. Their fourth album, 2013's Too Weird to Live, Too Rare to Die!, entered and peaked at number 2 on the US chart, and contained the platinum-certified lead single "Miss Jackson". The band's fifth studio album, Death of a Bachelor, was released in January 2016 and became their first number-one album in the US. Their sixth album, Pray for the Wicked, was released on June 22, 2018, and debuted at number one on the US Billboard 200.

Albums

Studio albums

Live albums

Compilation albums

Extended plays

Singles

Promotional singles

Other charted songs

Other appearances

Unreleased songs

Music videos

Notes

References

Discographies of American artists
Rock music group discographies
Pop punk group discographies
Discography